The List of Independents was a list that contested elections in Greece between 1946 and 1974.

History
The list contested the 1946 elections, the first after World War II. It received 1% of the vote and won two seats. The 1950 elections saw the list lose both seats as its vote share fell to 0.2%. The list remained seatless after the 1951 elections, but won two seats in 1952 when it received 3.6% of the vote. It retained its two seats in 1956.

The 1958 elections saw the list lose its representation in the Hellenic Parliament, and it remained seatless after elections in 1961, 1963, 1964, 1974, after which it ceased to contest elections.

Electoral history

Hellenic Parliament

References

Defunct political parties in Greece